The Interdisciplinary Group of Independent Experts (Grupo Interdisciplinario de Expertos Independientes, GIEI) is the title shared by a series of committees of human rights experts appointed by the Inter-American Commission of Human Rights to investigate particular incidents or scenarios of human rights violations. Legal scholars described the first such group, focused on a mass "disappearance" in Mexico, as "the first experience of international monitoring carried out within a criminal investigation process of its kind. It can be replicated and contribute to the investigation of emblematic cases and regional settings where processes of mass victimisation have occurred."

The instances of the Group so far are:

 Interdisciplinary Group of Independent Experts for the Ayotzinapa Case, established 2014, reactivated 2020
 Interdisciplinary Group of Independent Experts for Nicaragua, created July 2018
 Interdisciplinary Group of Independent Experts for Bolivia, examining human rights abuses during the Bolivian political crisis from September to December 2019

References 

International human rights organizations
Inter-American Commission on Human Rights